Laurel Jean Power (born 7 December 1953) is a former Australian politician.

She was born at Augathella and worked as a teacher before entering politics. A member of the Labor Party, she was elected to the Queensland Legislative Assembly as the member for Mansfield in 1989. She served as temporary chairman of committees from 1992 to 1995, when she was defeated by a Liberal candidate.

References

1953 births
Living people
Members of the Queensland Legislative Assembly
Australian Labor Party members of the Parliament of Queensland
Women members of the Queensland Legislative Assembly